On February 21, 1818, Representative Peterson Goodwyn (DR) of  died in office.  A special election was held to fill the resulting vacancy.

Election results

Pegram took his seat on November 16, at the start of the Second Session of the 15th Congress.  Pegram would only serve for that single session, as he would be defeated for re-election in 1819 against James Jones.

See also
List of special elections to the United States House of Representatives

References

Special elections to the 15th United States Congress
1818
Virginia 1818 19
1818 Virginia elections
Virginia 19
United States House of Representatives 1818 19